Free Form Patterns (also released as Reflections) is an album by the blues musician Lightnin' Hopkins backed by the rhythm section of the 13th Floor Elevators, recorded in Texas in 1968 and released on the International Artists label.

Reception

AllMusic's Al Campbell stated: "While not as revolutionary as John Lee Hooker's sessions with Canned Heat, Free Form Patterns steers clear of the late-'60s psychedelic trappings that screwed up such similar sessions as Electric Mud. No one tried to bend Hopkins to fit a foreign musical approach on Free Form Patterns; he made the music bend to him". Record Collector observed that "Free Form Patterns isn't some hippy hybrid, it's a pure blues album – actually, scrub that; it's a pure Lightnin’ Hopkins album". The Penguin Guide to Blues Recordings wrote: "Despite these interpolations it's a rather lacklustre affair".

Track listing
All compositions by Sam "Lightnin'" Hopkins except where noted
 "Mr. Charlie" – 7:02
 "Give Me Time to Think" – 3:49
 "Fox Chase" (Billy Bizor, Marty Rubenstein) – 2:53
 "Mr. Ditta's Grocery Store" – 5:30
 "Open Up Your Door" – 3:54
 "Baby Child" (Bizor, Rubenstein) – 3:35
 "Cooking's Done" – 3:48
 "Got Her Letter This Morning" – 4:57
 "Rain Falling" – 4:33
 "Mini Skirt" – 3:10

Personnel

Performance
Lightnin' Hopkins – electric guitar, vocals 
Duke Davis – bass
Danny Thomas – drums
Billy Bizor – harmonica and vocals

Production
Lelan Rogers – producer
Jim Duff – engineer

References

Lightnin' Hopkins albums
1968 albums
International Artists albums